Lucien "Luke" Ouellette  (born July 22, 1953) is a Canadian politician and former Member of the Legislative Assembly of Alberta representing the constituency of Innisfail-Sylvan Lake as a Progressive Conservative.

Early life

Ouellette was born July 22, 1953 in St. Paul and grew up on a farm in St. Lina. He has owned several small business and worked as an oil field consultant.

Political career

Ouellette was elected for his third term in the 2008 provincial election. He formerly served as Minister of Transportation. Ouellette received a mandate from Premier Ed Stelmach to double provincial investment in highway repaving and bridge repair over three years.

Transportation is Ouellette's third ministerial portfolio. During his second term, he was appointed first by then-Premier Ralph Klein as Minister of Restructuring and Government Efficiency. When Premier Ed Stelmach took over leadership of the Cabinet in December 2006, he made Ouellette the new Minister of Infrastructure and Transportation. He served in that capacity until March 12, 2008.

Ouellette was first elected in the 2001 provincial election. In addition to his role as a minister, he has been a member of numerous committees, including vice-chair of Climate Change Central and co-chair of the MLA Steering Committee for Rural Development.

Personal life

Ouellette has volunteered for many organizations in his community, including the Pine Lake Hub Centre, Crossroads Agricultural Society, YWCA in Lethbridge, Pine Lake Agricultural Park, former director of the Pine Lake Restoration Society, former co-chair of Clean Lake Days in Pine Lake and STARS Ambulance. He has coached minor baseball.

Election results

References

1953 births
Franco-Albertan people
Living people
Members of the Executive Council of Alberta
People from the County of St. Paul No. 19
Progressive Conservative Association of Alberta MLAs
21st-century Canadian politicians